The 32nd News & Documentary Emmy Awards were held on September 26, 2011, at Rose Hall, Home of Jazz at Lincoln Center, located in the Time Warner Center in New York City. Awards were presented in 42 categories, including Breaking News, Investigative Reporting, Outstanding Interview, and Best Documentary. In attendance were over 900 television and news media industry executives, news and documentary producers and journalists.

Notable awards included the Lifetime Achievement Award given to television and radio host Larry King.

Winners

Network breakdown
The following chart is a breakdown of number of awards won this awards season per station.

Breakdown by program

Awards

Nominees
 By station

Presenters
 Scott Pelley, anchor and managing editor, CBS News and correspondent, 60 Minutes
 Brian Ross, chief investigative correspondent, ABC News
 Gwen Ifill, moderator and managing editor, Washington Week and senior correspondent, The PBS NewsHour
 Sanjay Gupta, chief medical correspondent, CNN
 Sheila Nevins, president, HBO Documentary Films
 Lawrence O'Donnell, host, MSNBC's The Last Word
 Bill Small, past chairman, News & Documentary Emmy Awards
 Bruce Paisner, President & CEO, International Academy of Television Arts and Sciences

References

External links
 Official Site
 List of Nominees

32
2011 television awards
2011 in New York City
September 2011 events in the United States